"SpongeBob, You're Fired" is a television special of the American animated television series SpongeBob SquarePants, serving as the 11th episode of the ninth season and the 189th overall episode. It was written by Marc Ceccarelli, Luke Brookshier, and Mr. Lawrence (the former two also serving as storyboard directors), with supervising director Alan Smart and Tom Yasumi serving as animation directors. Originally premiering in Greece on July 3, 2013, it premiered on Nickelodeon in the United States that same year on November 11. In this episode, SpongeBob gets fired from the Krusty Krab after Mr. Krabs discovers he can save a nickel by letting him go. Subsequently, SpongeBob's attempts to apply at other restaurants end in humiliating failure.

"SpongeBob, You're Fired" was first screened at the 2013 San Diego Comic-Con International. Prior to broadcast on television, the episode created a level of controversy for its depiction of unemployment. It eventually sparked a political debate when Media Matters for America and Al Sharpton of MSNBC accused both the New York Post and Fox News of using the episode "to slam poor people who use social services". The premiere of "SpongeBob, You're Fired" drew 5.19 million viewers, the biggest audience viewership for a SpongeBob SquarePants episode in two years since "Frozen Face-Off" in July 2011.

Plot
At the Krusty Krab, owner Mr. Krabs takes over SpongeBob's fry cook position to save a nickel (he does not fire Squidward due to having seniority), leaving SpongeBob jobless. SpongeBob's best friend and neighbor Patrick  tells him the benefits of being unemployed. The two have a day of "glorious unemployment", but it ends with SpongeBob realizing that he needs a job. Over the next few days, SpongeBob tries getting a job at a hot dog joint, a pizzeria, a taqueria, and an Asian noodle house. He is fired every time for making food themed around Krabby Patties, instead of what each restaurant specializes in. However, when the patty items are a hit with the customers, the desperate restaurant managers fight with each other to get him back.

A mysterious person in a Krabby Patty costume arrives, defeats the restaurant managers, and takes SpongeBob back to the Krusty Krab. The person in the Krabby Patty costume is revealed to be Squidward, who tells SpongeBob that the restaurant has faltered ever since Mr. Krabs fired SpongeBob; Both he and Mr. Krabs ask SpongeBob to be the fry cook again. With his confidence restored, SpongeBob gladly accepts his old job, and bringing back all the customers. At the end of the episode, Mr. Krabs installs a pay toilet costs a nickel to use, thus making up the nickel that he previously lost by rehiring SpongeBob.

Promotion
On July 21, 2013, Tom Kenny presented an event called "SpongeCon 2013: The Year of the Fan" at the San Diego Comic-Con International 2013. The event hosted the official and exclusive sneak preview of "SpongeBob, You're Fired" and the screening of the SpongeBob SquareShorts global short film competition finalists. Prior to the official preview, a sneak peek of the episode was featured on Nick Studio 10, hosted by Noah Grossman and Gabrielle "Gabby" Senn, on June 10, 2013. A "SpongeBob expert" named Sophia said that "the unthinkable [will] happen to SpongeBob [in this episode]". She remarked that the episode is "pretty top secret".

In an October 30, 2013 article of the New York Post, it was first reported that "SpongeBob, You're Fired" would air on Nickelodeon in the United States on November 11, 2013.

As part of the marketing campaign for the episode, Nickelodeon debuted an online game of the same name. Beginning November 6, players could visit "nick.com/spongebob" to play the game. In the gameplay, players must accurately cook the orders of the diners while juggling each server's impatience level in order to keep them "happy as possible". Furthermore, Nickelodeon published a collection called SpongeBob SquarePants: Get to Work! on iTunes. On November 6, Nickelodeon debuted the full-length trailer of the episode to garner more exposure. Earlier that day, The Hollywood Reporter exclusively debuted the 45-second teaser. The source also released in advance an exclusive 90-second trailer of the episode, featuring SpongeBob getting the ax from Mr. Krabs, on November 4.

Ratings
"SpongeBob, You're Fired" first aired on Nickelodeon (Greece) on July 3, 2013. In the United States, it premiered on November 11. The original U.S. airing of the episode on Nickelodeon brought in the biggest audience viewership for a SpongeBob SquarePants episode in two years, with 5.186 million viewers tuning in overall. The episode tied with CBS' Hostages, the "poorest performer", from the "Big Four" of the night. However, across cable, the show outperformed The Real Housewives of Beverly Hills (0.8 adults), Teen Mom (0.7 adults) and The Daily Show (0.6 adults). The broadcast was the second most viewed show among all the day's cable programs (a Monday Night Football contest between the Miami Dolphins and Tampa Bay Buccaneers on ESPN came first). The episode topped the 2–11, 6–11 and 9–14 in the kids demographics.

Reception and controversy

Since its initial broadcast, "SpongeBob, You're Fired" was infamous for dialogue referencing the Supplemental Nutrition Assistance Program (Food Stamps benefit). In a scene from the episode, Patrick tries to show SpongeBob "the benefits of being unemployed", to which SpongeBob replies, "Unemployment may be fun for you, but I need to get a job." The scene was meant to demonstrate the title character's "eternal optimism and willingness to get back to work...in a way that's still funny and relatable". However, some political activists claimed the "notorious line" was a "slam" to the Food Stamps benefit. A report by The Hollywood Reporter alleged that the episode may have had a political agenda about the social safety net. It added that "It's not the first time SpongeBob has waded into social commentary, though usually when it does, it bugs the right and supports the left." The Hollywood Reporter cited the previous episodes "SpongeBob's Last Stand" and "Selling Out" for where "environmentalism is glorified" and "large businesses are demonized".

According to various sources, the story line is said to be "symbolic of a harsh economic climate". The plot eventually sparked a political debate for its depiction of unemployment. Prior to the premiere, the New York Post published an article on the episode. Critics accused the author, Andrea Morabito, of attacking "poor people" who rely on government assistance, referring to individuals who rely on food stamps as "mooching off the social services" and applauding SpongeBob for instead quickly returning to "gainful employment". Fox News's Heather Nauert of Fox & Friends stated that "the harsh economic climate has hit the underwater community", but "instead of mooching off social services at Bikini Bottom...SpongeBob sets out to return to the work force".

After the New York Post and Fox News commented on the episode, Media Matters for America, a politically progressive media watchdog group, responded. The group accused the media sources, both owned by media tycoon Rupert Murdoch, of using the episode "to slam poor people who use social services". In response to Fox News, Media Matters immediately posted an item online titled "Right-Wing Media Use SpongeBob SquarePants' Firing To Attack Social Safety Net", arguing that the two "are using the firing of fictional cartoon character SpongeBob SquarePants to attack the social safety net and those who rely on it". Media Matters was "also particularly bothered by [a] line from The Post story: 'Lest he sit around idly, mooching off the social services of Bikini Bottom, a depressed SpongeBob sets out to return to gainful employment wherever he can find it', reporter Andrea Morabito wrote. 'No spoilers—but it's safe to say that our hero doesn't end up on food stamps, as his patty-making skills turn out to be in high demand.'"

Civil rights activist and talk show host Al Sharpton of MSNBC remarked in the October 31 episode of PoliticsNation that "The right-wingers found a new hero in its war against the poor [...] SpongeBob SquarePants. That's right. SpongeBob SquarePants [...] So a sponge who lives in a pineapple under the sea doesn't need government help. That means no one does?"

Nickelodeon declined to comment on the issue caused by the message of the episode. However, Russell Hicks of Nickelodeon said the show is "tapping into the news of the moment, but did not specifically address any political leanings or ideologies within the episode." In a statement, Hicks said "Like all really great cartoons, part of SpongeBob's long-running success has been its ability to tap into the zeitgeist while still being really funny for our audience. As always, despite this momentary setback, SpongeBob's eternal optimism prevails, which is always a great message for everyone."

Merchandising
Nickelodeon and Random House released a book based on the episode called You're Fired!. The book is illustrated by David Aikins and was released on January 7, 2014. "SpongeBob, You're Fired!" was released on a DVD compilation of the same name on April 29, 2014, by Nickelodeon and Paramount Home Entertainment. The DVD includes the episode itself, "Neptune's Spatula", "Welcome to the Chum Bucket", "The Original Fry Cook", "Le Big Switch", "Model Sponge", "Employee of the Month", "Bossy Boots", "Krusty Dogs", "License to Milkshake", "Help Wanted", "Wet Painters", "Krusty Krab Training Video", and "Pizza Delivery". On October 10, 2017, "SpongeBob, You're Fired!" was released on the SpongeBob SquarePants: The Complete Ninth Season DVD, alongside all episodes of the ninth season. On June 4, 2019, "SpongeBob, You're Fired!" was released on the SpongeBob SquarePants: The Next 100 Episodes DVD, alongside all the episodes of seasons six through nine.

References
General
 

Specific

External links

 
 Episode's TV.com

SpongeBob SquarePants episodes
2010s American television specials
2013 controversies
2013 controversies in the United States
2013 American television episodes
2013 television specials
Animated television specials
Animation controversies in television
Political controversies in the United States
Mass media-related controversies in the United States
Works about labor
Television controversies in the United States
Television episodes about termination of employment
2010s controversies in the United States
2010s animated television specials